Garavito is a lunar impact crater that is located in the southern hemisphere on the Moon's far side. It lies to the north-northwest of the huge walled plain Poincaré, and to the west of the crater Chrétien. It takes its name in honor of the Colombian astronomer and engineer Julio Garavito Armero.

This crater has a worn and eroded outer rim, particularly along the west and southern edges. Along the northern rim, the satellite crater Garavito Y intrudes into the rim, and its outer flanks spread onto the interior floor of Garavito. A smaller crater Garavito D is attached to the northeastern exterior. The interior floor is relatively featureless, with a few tiny craterlets and the faint remains of old impacts.

Prior to formal naming in 1970 by the IAU, the crater was known as Crater 424.

References 

 
 
 
 
 
 
 
 
 
 
 
 

Impact craters on the Moon